La Chaussée-Saint-Victor, commonly known as La Chaussée, is a commune in the French department of Loir-et-Cher, Centre-Val de Loire.

Its inhabitants are known as Chausséens (masculine) and Chausséennes (feminine).

Population

See also
Communes of the Loir-et-Cher department

References

Communes of Loir-et-Cher